Varazqan (also Romanized as Varazqān, Varezqān,  and Verazqān; also known as Varzagān, Varzaghan Dezmar, Varzaqān, and Verazgan) is a village in Dizmar-e Markazi Rural District, Kharvana District, Varzaqan County, East Azerbaijan Province, Iran. At the 2006 census, its population was 131, in 34 families.

References 

Towns and villages in Varzaqan County